Squash was contested from September 30 to October 4 at the 2002 Asian Games in Busan, South Korea. Competition consists of men's and women's singles competition with all matches to be played at the Yangsan College Gymnasium.

Ong Beng Hee of Malaysia won the men's gold medal while Rebecca Chiu from Hong Kong won the women's competition.

Schedule

Medalists

Medal table

Participating nations
A total of 32 athletes from 13 nations competed in squash at the 2002 Asian Games:

References
 www.worldsquash.org.uk

External links
 www.squashtalk.com
 Results

 
2002 Asian Games events
2002
Asian Games
2002 Asian Games